Zhang Henshui (May 18, 1895 – February 15, 1967) was the pen name of Zhang Xinyuan (张心远), a popular and prolific Chinese novelist. He published more than 100 novels in his 50 years of fiction writing.

Early life 
On May 18, 1895, Zhang was born in Nanchang, Jiangxi province, China. Zhang was educated until age 16 in Suzhou, China. At age 16, Zhang's father died. Zhang moved to Qianshan, Anhui, his ancestral home.

Career 
Keen in classical vernacular (baihua) literature since youth, he began composing in the vein of zhanghui xiaoshuo (章回小说), novels written in vernacular style using classical Chinese poetry as chapter headings. 

Zhang started his career as a member of a theatre troupe. Zhang joined the press in 1918 as an editor. Zhang became a journalist in Wuhan. In 1919, Zhang became a newspaper editor in Beijing, China. 

Zhang took up novel-writing as a hobby. The first of his novels serialized was A Pining Song for the Southern Country (南国相思谱, 1919).  After departing for Beijing in 1919 to work as a newspaper editor, his first major long work, An Unofficial History of Beijing (春明外史, Chunming Waishi, 1929), was serialized between 1924 and 1929.  It was a huge success and established him as the pre-eminent popular novelist of his generation. His masterpieces A Family of Distinction (金粉世家, Jinfen shijia, 1927–32) and Fate in Tears and Laughter (啼笑因缘, Tixiao Yinyuan, 1930) were much more perspicaciously planned than his earlier books.  At the height of his popularity he concurrently worked on six novels on serialization, in between his career as a press-man and editor.

The fourth of his major works, Eighty-One Dreams (八十一梦, Bashiyi meng), was published in 1941.  This work, perhaps the most representative of his 40-odd novels set during the War of Resistance against Japan, uses parables and dream sequences to satirize the corrupt bureaucracy.  Suffering a stroke in 1949, Zhang temporarily lost the ability to walk, but continued to write.

It is estimated that throughout his life Zhang wrote a total of some 30 million Chinese characters in over 110 novels.  His works emphasize realistic dialogue, often interposing people from different social strata and were thus hugely popular amongst the Chinese public from 1920s to 1940s.

Works

Translated works 
Shanghai Express: A thirties novel, trans. by William A. Lyell (Honolulu: University of Hawaii Press, 1997).

Personal life 
On February 15, 1967, Zhang died of a brain hemorrhage in Beijing, China.

Media adaptations
Some television series are based on works by Zhang. A Family of Distinction has been adapted at least twice, once during the 1980s, when Hong Kong television broadcaster Television Broadcasts Limited produced the series Yesterday’s Glitter, and during the 2000s, with the Mainland China television series The Story of a Noble Family.

See also
Literature of China

References

Additional sources 
Zhang Henshui and Popular Chinese Fiction, 1919-1949 by Thomas Michael McClellan (Edwin Mellen Press, 2005)

External sources 
 Shanghai Express

Republic of China novelists
1895 births
1967 deaths
Chinese travel writers
People from Shangrao
Writers from Jiangxi
20th-century novelists
Chinese male novelists
20th-century Chinese male writers